Pierre Couderc (18 November 1896 – 6 October 1966) was a French screenwriter, actor, acrobat, and film producer. He wrote for 34 films between 1925 and 1930. He also appeared in ten films between 1914 and 1934. He was born in Paris, France and died in Santa Monica, California.

Selected filmography
 The Patchwork Girl of Oz (1914)
 His Majesty, the Scarecrow of Oz (1914)
 Terror Trail (1921)
 On Your Toes (1927)
 The Big Trail (1931)

External links

1896 births
1966 deaths
French male screenwriters
French emigrants to the United States
French male film actors
French male silent film actors
French film producers
20th-century French male actors
Male actors from Paris
20th-century French male writers
20th-century French screenwriters